Conversion therapy is the practice of attempting to change a person's sexual orientation or gender identity.  As of February 2023, twenty-three countries have bans on conversion therapy, eight of them ban the practice by any person: Canada, Ecuador, France, Germany, Greece, Malta, New Zealand and Spain; seven ban its practice by medical professionals only; Albania, Brazil, India, Israel, Portugal, Vietnam and Taiwan; another eight: Argentina, Chile, Fiji, Nauru, Paraguay, Samoa, Switzerland, and Uruguay have indirect bans in that diagnoses based solely on sexual orientation or gender identity are banned without specifically banning conversion therapy, this effectively amounts to a ban on health professionals since they would not generally engage in therapy without a diagnosis. In addition, some jurisdictions within Australia, Mexico and the United States also ban conversion therapy. In China and South Africa case law has found conversion therapy to be unlawful. Bills banning conversion therapy are being considered in Ireland, Mexico, Poland, Belgium, Netherlands, Austria, Cyprus, and the United Kingdom.

Legal status by country

Legal status by US state
 
Although no national ban exists, several US states and individual counties ban therapy attempting to change sexual orientation as shown in the map below.

Legal cases
On 25 June 2015, a New Jersey jury found the Jewish conversion therapy organization JONAH guilty of consumer fraud in the case Ferguson v. JONAH for promising to be able to change its clients' sexual urges and determined its commercial practices to be unconscionable.

In a 1997 U.S. case, the Ninth Circuit addressed conversion therapy in the context of an asylum application. A Russian citizen "had been apprehended by the Russian militia, registered at a clinic as a 'suspected lesbian', and forced to undergo treatment for lesbianism, such as 'sedative drugs' and hypnosis. ... The Ninth Circuit held that the conversion treatments to which Pitcherskaia had been subjected constituted mental and physical torture." The court rejected the argument that the treatments to which Pitcherskaia had been subjected did not constitute persecution because they had been intended to help her, not harm her, and stated "human rights laws cannot be sidestepped by simply couching actions that torture mentally or physically in benevolent terms such as 'curing' or 'treating' the victims".

In 1993, the Superior Court of San Francisco's Family Court placed 15-year-old lesbian Lyn Duff under the guardianship of a foster couple after her mother committed her to Rivendell Psychiatric Center in West Jordan, Utah, where she allegedly endured physical abuse under the guise of conversion therapy. Lyn Duff's petition to leave her mother was granted without court opinion.

See also
Psychology of internet

References
Notes

 Citations

Further reading

Conversion therapy